Gregorio Santacroce (died 1611) was a Roman Catholic prelate who served as Bishop of Giovinazzo (1610–1611).

Biography
Gregorio Santacroce was ordained a priest in the Order of Saint Benedict. On 12 June 1606, he was appointed by Pope Paul V as Coadjutor Bishop of Giovinazzo and Titular Bishop of Dragobitia. He succeeded to the bishopric on March 1610 after the death of his predecessor. He served as Bishop of Giovinazzo  until his death in 1611.

References

External links and additional sources
 (for Chronology of Bishops) 
 (for Chronology of Bishops) 

17th-century Italian Roman Catholic bishops
1610 deaths
Bishops appointed by Pope Paul V
Benedictine bishops